Datuk Seri Abdul Hakim bin Borhan (born 1951) is a former Mayor of Kuala Lumpur.

Honours
 :
 Member of the Order of the Defender of the Realm (A.M.N.) (1999)
 :
 Recipient of the Distinguished Conduct Medal (Silver) (P.P.T.) (1987)
 Member of the Order of the Crown of Selangor (A.M.S.) (1995)
 Companion of the Order of Sultan Salahuddin Abdul Aziz Shah (S.S.A.) (1997)
 Knight Companion of the Order of Sultan Sharafuddin Idris Shah (D.S.I.S.) - Dato’ (2002)
 :
 Grand Commander of the Order of the Territorial Crown (S.M.W.) - Datuk Seri (2009)

References 

Living people
Mayors of Kuala Lumpur
Members of the Order of the Defender of the Realm
1951 births